The banking sector in Bangladesh consists of several types of institutions. Bangladesh Bank is the central bank of Bangladesh and the chief regulatory authority in the banking sector.

Pursuant to the Bangladesh Bank Order, 1972 the Government of Bangladesh reorganised the Dhaka Branch of the State Bank of Pakistan as the central bank of the country, and named it Bangladesh Bank with retrospective effect from 16 December 1971. 
Other than Bangladesh Bank, banks in Bangladesh are primarily categorized into two types: Scheduled and Non-Scheduled banks.

Scheduled banks
Scheduled banks are licensed under the Bank Company Act, 1991 (Amended up to 2013).
Currently, there are 61 scheduled banks in Bangladesh.

State-owned commercial banks (SOCBs) 
There are 6 state-owned commercial banks (SOCBs) that are fully or majorly owned by the Government of Bangladesh.

Agrani Bank Limited
Bangladesh Development Bank
BASIC Bank Limited
Janata Bank Limited
Rupali Bank Limited
Sonali Bank Limited

Specialized banks (SDBs) 
3 specialized banks are now operating which were established for specific objectives like agricultural or industrial development. These banks are also fully or majorly owned by the Government of Bangladesh.
Bangladesh Krishi Bank
Rajshahi Krishi Unnayan Bank
Probashi Kallyan Bank

Private commercial banks (PCBs)
There is a total of 43 PCBs in operation right now. They are majorly owned by private entities and classified into two types.

Conventional PCBs
In total 33 conventional PCBs are now operating in the industry. They perform the banking functions in conventional fashion i.e. interest-based operations.

AB Bank Limited
Bangladesh Commerce Bank Limited
Bank Asia Limited
Bengal Commercial Bank Limited
BRAC Bank Limited 
Citizens Bank PLC
City Bank Limited
Community Bank Bangladesh Limited
Dhaka Bank Limited
Dutch-Bangla Bank Limited
Eastern Bank Limited
IFIC Bank Limited
Jamuna Bank Limited
Meghna Bank Limited
Mercantile Bank Limited
Midland Bank Limited
Modhumoti Bank Limited
Mutual Trust Bank Limited
National Bank Limited
National Credit & Commerce Bank Limited
NRB Bank Limited
NRB Commercial Bank Limited
One Bank Limited
Padma Bank Limited
Premier Bank Limited
Prime Bank Limited
Pubali Bank Limited
Shimanto Bank Limited
Southeast Bank Limited
South Bangla Agriculture and Commerce Bank Limited
Trust Bank Limited
United Commercial Bank PLC
Uttara Bank Limited

Islami Shariah Based PCBs
There are 10 Islami Shariah-based PCBs in Bangladesh and they execute banking activities according to Islami Shariah-based principles i.e. Profit-Loss Sharing (PLS) mode.

Al-Arafah Islami Bank Limited
EXIM Bank Limited
First Security Islami Bank Limited
Global Islamic Bank Limited
ICB Islamic Bank Limited
Islami Bank Bangladesh Limited
Shahjalal Islami Bank Limited
Social Islami Bank Limited
Union Bank Limited
 Standard Bank Limited

Foreign commercial banks (FCBs)
In total 9 FCBs are operating in Bangladesh as the branches of the banks which are incorporated in abroad.
Bank Al-Falah Limited (Pakistan)
Citibank N.A (United States of America)
Commercial Bank of Ceylon PLC (Sri Lanka)
Habib Bank Limited (Pakistan)
HSBC (United Kingdom)
National Bank of Pakistan (Pakistan)
Standard Chartered Bank (United Kingdom)
State Bank of India (India)
Woori Bank (South Korea)

Non-scheduled banks
Non-scheduled banks are licensed only for specific functions and objectives, and do not offer the same range of services as scheduled banks. 
There are now 5 non-scheduled banks in Bangladesh.
Ansar VDP Unnayan Bank
Grameen Bank
Jubilee Bank
Karmashangosthan Bank
Palli Sanchay Bank

Non-bank financial institutions (NBFIs)
Non-bank financial institutions (NBFIs), simply known as financial institutions (FIs), are those types of financial institutions which are regulated under Financial Institution Act, 1993 and controlled by Bangladesh Bank. Now, 34 FIs are operating in Bangladesh while the maiden one was established in 1981. Out of the total, two are fully government owned, one is the subsidiary of a SOCB, 15 were initiated by private domestic initiative and 15 were initiated by joint venture initiative.

NBFI's include:
Agrani SME Financing Company Limited
Bangladesh Finance and Investment Company Limited  (BD Finance)
Bangladesh Industrial Finance Company Limited (BIFC)
Bangladesh Infrastructure Finance Fund Limited (BIFFL)
Bay Leasing and Investment Limited
CVC Finance Limited
Delta Brac Housing Finance Corporation Ltd. (DBH)
Fareast Finance and Investment Limited
FAS Finance and Investment Limited
First Finance Limited
GSP Finance Company (Bangladesh) Limited (GSPB)
Hajj Finance Company Limited
IDLC Finance Limited
Industrial and Infrastructure Development Finance Company Limited (IIDFC)
Infrastructure Development Company Limited (IDCOL)
International Leasing and Financial Services Limited
IPDC Finance Limited
Islamic Finance and Investment Limited
LankaBangla Finance Limited
Lankan Alliance Finance Limited
Meridian Finance and Investment Limited.
MIDAS Financing Limited. (MFL)
National Finance Limited
National Housing Finance and Investments Limited
People's Leasing and Financial Services Limited
Phoenix Finance and Investments Limited
Premier Leasing and Finance Limited
Prime Finance and Investment Limited
Reliance Finance Limited
Saudi-Bangladesh Industrial and Agricultural Investment Company Limited (SABINCO)
The UAE-Bangladesh Investment Company Limited
Union Capital Limited
United Finance Limited
Uttara Finance and Investments Limited

Specialized financial institutions (semi formal sector)
Bangladesh House Building Finance Corporation (BHBFC)
Palli Karma Sahayak Foundation (PKSF)

References

Banks
Bangladesh
 
Bangladesh